White Loch is a small lowland freshwater loch that is located directly to the east of Fingask Loch in the valley of the Lunan Burn and is 1.5 miles south of Blairgowrie, in Perth and Kinross. The loch is also a designated Site of Special Scientific Interest (SSSI), as well as forming part of a Special Area of Conservation.

Geography
White Loch is one of three lochs that sit in a row on an orientation of 280 degrees, with Fingask Loch directly to the west and the tiny, almost pond sized Black Loch sitting directly to the east. White Loch drains into Fingask Loch which in turn drains into small burn that meets the Lunan Burn.

References

Freshwater lochs of Scotland
Lochs of Perth and Kinross
Tay catchment
Protected areas of Perth and Kinross
Sites of Special Scientific Interest in Scotland
Conservation in the United Kingdom
Special Areas of Conservation in Scotland
Birdwatching sites in Scotland